New Zealand competed at the 2014 Commonwealth Games in Glasgow, from 23 July to 3 August 2014. It was the nation's 20th appearance at the Commonwealth Games, having competed at every Games since their inception in 1930. The New Zealand Olympic Committee registered the complete team on 8 July 2014, with 239 athletes competing at the Games across all 17 sports. The team was reduced to 238 prior to the opening ceremony, after judoka Patti Grogan withdrew due to an unspecified health issue.

New Zealand left Glasgow with 45 medals, including 14 golds, across 14 sports. It was the third-equal largest medal haul by the country, tying with the 2002 Games in Manchester and behind the 1950 and 1990 Games, both hosted by New Zealand in Auckland. In gold medals, the total was second only to the Auckland 1990 Games. One-third of the nation's medals were won in cycling; no medals were won in badminton, table tennis or triathlon.

Officials
On 14 December 2012, Rob Waddell was appointed New Zealand's chef de mission for the 2014 Commonwealth Games and 2016 Summer Olympics.

Medal table 

| width="78%" align="left" valign="top" |

|style="text-align:left;width:22%;vertical-align:top;"|

Athletics

The NZOC announced the first athletes on 7 April, with additional athletes added on 5 May, 4 June, 19 June and 4 July. Marathon runner Kim Smith pulled out of the Games on 27 June due to a foot injury.

Track

Field - Jumps

Field - Throws

Combined

Badminton

The NZOC announced the team on 7 May 2014.

Individual events

Mixed team

Pool C

Boxing

The NZOC announced its initial seven-member boxing team on 29 May 2014, adding two extra members a week later on 6 June.

Men

Women

Cycling

Mountain biking

Road

The NZOC announced an eleven-member team on 8 May 2014. James Oram pulled out of the team on 10 June, while Hayden Roulston pulled out on 16 June due to injury.

Road race

Time trial

Track
The NZOC announced the initial fourteen-member team on 17 April 2014. Two additional team members were added on 28 May and 10 June.

Sprint

Keirin

Time trial

Pursuit

Points race

Scratch race

Diving

Gymnastics

The NZOC announced the team on 13 June 2014.

Artistic

Men

Team

Individual all-around

Individual

Women
Courtney McGregor suffered a knee injury and withdrew from participating on 28 July, the day of the first event.

Team

Individual all-around

Individual

Rhythmic

Hockey

Men

Team
Phil Burrows, Marcus Child, Simon Child, Dean Couzins (c), Steve Edwards, Nick Haig, Andy Hayward, Blair Hilton, Hugo Inglis, Devon Manchester, Shea McAleese, Shay Neal, Arun Panchia, Alex Shaw, Bradley Shaw, Blair Tarrant

Pool B

Semifinal

Bronze medal match

Women

The NZOC announced the team on 26 June 2014.

Team
Sam Charlton, Sophie Cocks, Rhiannon Dennison, Gemma Flynn, Krystal Forgesson, Katie Glynn, Jordan Grant, Rose Keddell, Olivia Merry, Stacey Michelsen, Emily Naylor, Anita Punt, Sally Rutherford, Liz Thompson, Petrea Webster, Kayla Whitelock (c)

Pool A

Semifinal

Bronze medal match

Judo

The NZOC announced the team on 16 May 2014.

Lawn bowls

Men

Women

Para

Netball

The NZOC announced the team on 10 June 2014.

Team
Jodi Brown, Leana de Bruin, Shannon Francois, Katrina Grant, Ellen Halpenny, Anna Harrison, Joline Henry, Casey Kopua (c), Laura Langman, Cathrine Latu, Liana Leota, Maria Tutaia

Pool A

Semifinal

Gold medal match

Rugby sevens

The NZOC announced the team on 7 July 2014.

 Team
Pita Ahki, Scott Curry, Sam Dickson, DJ Forbes (c), Bryce Heem, Akira Ioane, Gillies Kaka, Ben Lam, Tim Mikkelson, Declan O'Donnell, Sherwin Stowers, Joe Webber

 Pool A

Quarter final

Semi final

Gold medal match

Shooting

Men

Women

Squash

The NZOC announced the team on 20 May 2013.

Singles

Doubles

Swimming

The NZOC announced the swimming team on 11 April 2014.

Men

Women

Qualifiers for the latter rounds (Q) of all events were decided on a time only basis, therefore positions shown are overall results versus competitors in all heats.
* – Indicates athlete swam in the preliminaries but not in the final race.

Table tennis

The NZOC announced the men's team on 6 June 2014, and the women's team on 18 June 2014.

Singles

Doubles

Team
 John Cordue
 Peter Jackson
 Shane Laugesen
 Teng Teng Liu
 Phillip Xiao
 Jenny Hung
 Chunli Li
 Karen Li
 Sun Yang
 Annie Yang

Triathlon

Individual events

Mixed relay

Weightlifting

The NZOC announced the team on 12 June 2014.

Men

Women

Wrestling

Only freestyle wrestling events are being held in Glasgow.

The NZOC announced the team on 23 May 2014.

See also
2014 Commonwealth Games

Notes

References

Nations at the 2014 Commonwealth Games
2014